Anesti Vito (born 19 June 1971) is an Albanian retired football player who played as a striker.

Club career
Vito played the majority of his career for hometown club Flamurtari, with whom he won the 1991 league title. He played two Cup Winners' Cup matches for Albpetrol in 1993.

In summer 2001, Vito scored in an Intertoto Cup game for Bylis Ballsh.

Honours
Albanian Superliga: 1
 1991, 2000

References

External links
 Profile - FSHF

1971 births
Living people
Footballers from Vlorë
Albanian footballers
Association football forwards
Flamurtari Vlorë players
KS Albpetrol Patos players
KF Tirana players
FK Tomori Berat players
Kategoria Superiore players